The Canon PowerShot S90 is a high-end 10.0-megapixel compact digital camera originally announced in 2009. The PowerShot S90 is the successor of the Canon PowerShot S80.

The almost 4-year gap between the S80 and the S90, compared with intervals of 6 months to 1 year between prior versions, led to the line being popularly considered discontinued, and thus the S90 as a revival, rather than a strict successor.

Features
 10.0 megapixels
 JPEG (Exif 2.2) support
 Raw image file format; one of few "point and shoot" cameras to have raw formatting. (Note: Raw format is not available in Auto, Low Light, and SCN modes. Raw is available in Program, TV (shutter priority), Av (aperture priority), Manual, and Custom modes)
 ISO sensitivity 80–3200 and auto. Low light mode can shoot up to ISO 12800. 
 Wide-angle zoom lens 6.0–22.5 mm (35 mm equivalent: 28–105 mm)
 Full manual control
 Customizable Control Ring to control ISO, shutter speed, aperture, focus, or exposure compensation 
 DIGIC 4 with iSAPS technology
 Video recording 640 × 480 at 30 frame/s, 320 × 240 at 30 frame/s

Reception 
The S90 has received good, in some cases excellent reviews, with reviewers praising its image quality, small size, and ease of using manual mode, particularly due to its distinctive control ring. The fast (f/2) lens and the decision to reduce the pixel count (hence reducing noise; also found in the G11) are particularly cited. The primary criticisms, beyond the general limitations of small sensor and small size, are that its ergonomics are lacking, and in particular that the rear dial moves too easily, changing exposure and often ruining photos.

To address the ergonomic criticisms, third parties have developed a custom grip to make the camera easier to grip, and a plastic ring to surround the control dial, making the dial less likely to be accidentally moved.

Similar cameras 
In the high-end compact camera market, its main competitor is the Panasonic Lumix DMC-LX3 (and the Lumix's sister camera, the Leica D-Lux 4); one significant difference being that the S90 is significantly slimmer due to the fully collapsible lens, hence more portable.

The Canon PowerShot S95 was announced and released in 2010. It was designed as the successor to the Canon PowerShot S90 but both cameras are currently sold.

The Canon PowerShot G series (the G11) are similar in terms of target market, but feature a larger body and slower optics at the wide angle end.

A similar category to high-end compact cameras are mirrorless interchangeable lens cameras ("micros"), some of which are in a compact form factor (with a similar-sized body), such as the Panasonic Lumix DMC-GF1, Olympus PEN E-P1/E-P2, and Sony Alpha NEX-3. Micros differ however in being significantly larger (with lens attached), and significantly higher-end, featuring much larger sensors and interchangeable lenses.

References

Canon PowerShot S90 specifications at Canon UK
Canon S90 Review

External links

 Digicamhelp Blog » Canon s90, by Gail Bjork – blog about S90
 In-depth Canon S90 review at Enticing the Light (with depth-of-field and hyperfocal distance tables in Part 2): Part 1, Part 2 and Part 3

S90